In applied mathematics, a nonlinear complementarity problem (NCP) with respect to a mapping ƒ : Rn → Rn, denoted by NCPƒ, is to find a vector x ∈ Rn such that

 

where ƒ(x) is a smooth mapping. The case of a discontinuous mapping was discussed by Habetler and Kostreva (1978).

References 

 
 

Applied mathematics